San Nicola is a church in Ottana, central Sardinia, Italy. Dedicated to St. Nicholas of Myra, it was consecrated in 1160. It is located on a hill commanding the town and is reached through a staircase. 

The interior houses a 16th-century wooden crucifix and a 14th-century polyptych, known as Ottana Altarpiece. It is attributed to a "Master of the Franciscan tempera", active in Naples between 1330 and 1345. Among other figures, it portrays the then hereditary giudice of Arborea, Mariano IV of Arborea.

Sources

Nicola Ottana
Romanesque architecture in Sardinia